A. E. Newton may refer to:
Arthur Newton, Somerset and Oxford University cricketer
A. Edward Newton, American author, publisher, and book collector